The Puerto Rico Center for the New Economy (CNE)  is an economy-centered think tank that has emerged as an incubator for future economic public policy in that United States territory. Founded in 1998 and funded by the private sector, the CNE partnered with the Brookings Institution, a national think-tank, to produce Brookings' most recent benchmark economic study of Puerto Rico in 2006, "The Economy of Puerto Rico: Restoring Economic Growth".

Major corporate support for the CNE comes from Banco Popular de Puerto Rico, Cemex, First BanCorp, Doral Bank, among others, while its main foundation support comes from the Citi Foundation, the Ford Foundation and the Wilbur Marvin Foundation.

The CNE is headed by Yale University- and Vanderbilt University-trained Miguel Soto Class and has a research staff that includes lawyer and economist Sergio Marxuach.  Its reports and recommendations usually receive ample coverage in the local press and are highly respected in government circles.

Publications

Fiscal Situation Update : September 2008

Diez Ideas Para Puerto Rico

Fiscal Situation Update: April 2008

Por debajo de la mesa: Una mirada a los trabajadores informales de Puerto Rico

Ponencia del Centro para la Nueva Economía ante la Comisión de Hacienda y Asuntos Financieros de la Cámara de Representantes del Estado Libre Asociado de Puerto Rico

A Transnational Migrant Crossroads: The Circulation of People and Money in Puerto Rico

Los/las trabajadores/as pobres en Puerto Rico: La situación y las posibles soluciones

Fiscal Situation Update: May 2007

Endeudando al de aquí: Los préstamos por depósito diferido en Puerto Rico

Municipal Fiscal Crisis in the United States: Lessons and Policy Recommendations for Puerto Rico

Recomendaciones para atender la difícil situación fiscal de Puerto Rico

Restructuring the Puerto Rico Electricity Sector

Building a Nation of Owners: Utilizing Credit Unions to Increase Financial Access and Expand Asset Ownership in Puerto Rico

Pathways Out of Poverty: Asset Building in Puerto Rico

Channeling People Into the Economic Mainstream: Financial Access in Puerto Rico

Getting Serious About Biotech: Challenges and Opportunities for Puerto Rico

Memorando al Gobernador de Puerto Rico: Recomendaciones para el desarrollo económico

Providing Genuine Equality of Opportunity: The Case for Puerto Rican Stakeholder Accounts
	
Las PYMES y los retos de la Nueva Economía (Artículo Breve)

Reaping the Benefits of Work: A Tax Credit for Low-Income Working Families in Puerto Rico
	
Silicon Reef: Puerto Rico's Path Towards the Digital Economy
	
Internet Market Study: Profile of Internet Users in Puerto Rico
	
Assessing the Industry Cluster Approach to Economic Development: Identifying Challenges to Growing Puerto Rico's Digital Economy

Policy and Development Challenges of the Internet Economy

References

Political and economic think tanks based in Puerto Rico